McKeefrey is an unincorporated community in Marshall County, West Virginia, United States. It was also known as Round Bottom and Chestnut Hill.

The community was named after one Mr. Keefrey, the proprietor of a local mine.

References 

Unincorporated communities in West Virginia
Unincorporated communities in Marshall County, West Virginia